Nyarugusu refugee camp is one of the largest and best-known refugee camps of the 21st century, with around 150,000 refugees.
It is located in the western province of Kigoma, Tanzania, about 150 km east of Lake Tanganyika.

The camp was created by the UNHCR and the Tanzanian government in 1996 after an estimated 150,000 Congolese refugees from the eastern Sud-Kivu region of the DRC crossed the border into Tanzania escaping civil war. Many Congolese refugees remained in the camp for decades, although the population of the camp was reducing prior to 2015. However, in 2015 over 110,000 Burundian refugees arrived in Tanzania to escape riots and civil unrest in Burundi. These refugees went to Nyarugusu until the Tanzanian government allowed Burundian refugees to go to other camps. Approximately 65,000 Burundian refugees remain at Nyarugusu, while 55,000 are at Nduta refugee camp, and another 19,000 are at Mtendeli refugee camp.

See also
 New English Center for Hope

References

Refugee camps in Tanzania
1990s establishments in Tanzania
Populated places established in the 1990s